Our Lady Academy is a name used by number of all-girl schools, including:
Our Lady Academy (Bay St. Louis, Mississippi)
Our Lady Academy, Waltham, MA

Catholic high schools in the United States